Caroline Chimot (born 22 April 1978) is a French rhythmic gymnast. She competed in the women's group all-around event at the 1996 Summer Olympics.

References

1978 births
Living people
French rhythmic gymnasts
Olympic gymnasts of France
Gymnasts at the 1996 Summer Olympics
People from Seclin
Sportspeople from Nord (French department)